Jonathan Racine (born May 28, 1993) is a Canadian professional ice hockey defenceman who is currently playing with HC Vita Hästen in the Swedish HockeyAllsvenskan (Allsv). Racine was selected by the Florida Panthers in the third round (87th overall) of the 2011 NHL Entry Draft.

Playing career
On April 3, 2013, the Florida Panthers of the NHL signed Racine a three-year entry-level contract and he began his professional career in the American Hockey League (AHL) with the San Antonio Rampage.

On April 1, 2014, Racine was recalled to the Florida Panthers where he skated 15:35 in his NHL debut against the New York Islanders before being returned the following day to San Antonio.

Prior to the 2016–17 season, Racine was traded by the Panthers to the Montreal Canadiens in exchange for Tim Bozon on October 8, 2016. He was immediately assigned to begin the year with AHL affiliate, the St. John's IceCaps. He appeared in just 26 games with the IceCaps for 3 assists, before he was traded again, along with a 6th round pick in the 2017 NHL Entry Draft to the Tampa Bay Lightning for defenseman Nikita Nesterov on January 26, 2017. Racine was assigned to play out the remainder of the season with the Lightning's AHL affiliate, the Syracuse Crunch.

As a free agent from the Lightning, Racine received limited NHL interest. On September 27, 2017, he was announced to have signed an AHL professional try-out contract to attend the Ontario Reign training camp. He was later revealed to have signed an AHL contract with the Reign upon his reassignment to the Manchester Monarchs of the ECHL on October 1, 2017.

Approaching his sixth full professional season in 2018–19, Racine opted to continue his career in signing a one-year ECHL contract with the Brampton Beast on October 4, 2018. He was later loaned to AHL affiliate, the Belleville Senators and later signed to a AHL contract for the remainder of the season on November 6, 2018. He made 9 appearances with Belleville, contributing with 1 goal.

As a free agent from the Senators, Racine opted to continue his career in the ECHL, agreeing to terms with the Maine Mariners on October 1, 2019. He was loaned to the AHL, signing a professional try-out with the Stockton Heat, affiliate to the Calgary Flames on December 10, 2019.

After 7 games with the Heat, Racine left the team and North America, agreeing to a contract for the remainder of the season with Finnish club, Tappara of the Liiga on February 15, 2020.

After spending the 2020–21 season in Austria with HC TWK Innsbruck of the ICE Hockey League, Racine continued his European career by agreeing to a one-year contract with Swedish second division club, HC Vita Hästen of the HockeyAllsvenskan, on June 11, 2021.

Career statistics

Regular season and playoffs

International

References

External links

1993 births
Living people
Belleville Senators players
Black Canadian ice hockey players
Brampton Beast players
Canadian ice hockey defencemen
Florida Panthers draft picks
Florida Panthers players
HC TWK Innsbruck players
Maine Mariners (ECHL) players
Manchester Monarchs (ECHL) players
Ice hockey people from Montreal
Moncton Wildcats players
Ontario Reign (AHL) players
Portland Pirates players
St. John's IceCaps players
San Antonio Rampage players
Shawinigan Cataractes players
Stockton Heat players
Syracuse Crunch players
Tappara players
HC Vita Hästen players